Woodmore is an unincorporated area and census-designated place (CDP 86710) in Prince George's County, Maryland, United States. Per the 2020 census, the population was 4,513. The CDP is located within the boundaries of Route 193 (Enterprise Road) to the west, Church Road to the east, Route 214 (Central Avenue) to the south and Route 50 to the north. Woodmore Road runs east and west through the center. It contains a large gated community and country club, developments of Woodmore Meadows, and Woodmore South on the south side, as well as various other custom built homes and farmland. 

Off Enterprise Road sits the development of Kingsford. It is contiguous with Mitchellville, Maryland CDP, and historically had a Mitchellville mailing address, for many years served by the South Bowie/Mitchellville Post Office with zip code 20721 and has been considered part of Mitchellville. The Woodmore and Mitchellville community is notable as one of the most affluent predominantly African-American communities in the United States.

The gated community "Woodmore" is centered on the Country Club at Woodmore. Six Flags America is within the boundaries of the CDP.

History 
The first colonial owner of the Woodmore site was Thomas Spriggs, who in 1698 acquired  of what was then known as the forest of Prince George's County in the Crown Colony of Maryland.

The first house in the area was a two-story brick house named Pleasant Prospect (still standing at 12806 Woodmore Road)., built c. 1798 by Dr. Isaac Ducket, the husband of Spriggs' granddaughter. He also doubled the size of the estate to over 1,000 acres.

Pleasant Prospect was inherited by Ducket's son-in-law, John Contee, and then by his son, also John Contee, who became indebted and sold the estate to the Bowies, then the Washington D.C. lumber magnates the Walkers. Although the Walker family sold the house in 1982, Walker descendants also continued to own land and farm on the south side of Woodmore Road, part of which farmland was sold to create Woodmore Meadows.

In 1981 the Country Club at Woodmore was redesigned and the gated community planned, a process which took 15 years as the seven area homeowner associations eventually merged. In 2010 the U.S. Census Bureau redefined northern parts of the Woodmore CDP as the new Fairwood CDP.

Geography
Woodmore is located at  (38.934861, −76.778202).

Gated community
The Woodmore gated community has about 400 houses, including single family and townhouses. About 33% of the residents of the gated community are members of the Country Club at Woodmore; the two are, as described by Keisha Stewart of The Washington Post, "intertwined". Stewart described the Woodmore gated community as "one of Prince George's County's premier subdivisions" that "represents prestige and accomplishment for some, while for others it is a serene haven."

In 2005 the range of residences was from $400,000 to $2 million, with townhouses cheaper than single family houses. According to Stewart, in 2005, "$1 million houses [were] not uncommon in Woodmore."

Demographics

2020 census

Note: the US Census treats Hispanic/Latino as an ethnic category. This table excludes Latinos from the racial categories and assigns them to a separate category. Hispanics/Latinos can be of any race.

2000 Census
There were 1,977 households, out of which 45.0% had children under the age of 18 living with them, 68.1% were married couples living together, 11.4% had a female householder with no husband present, and 16.7% were non-families. 

12.7% of all households were made up of individuals, and 1.2% had someone living alone who was 65 years of age or older. The average household size was 3.07 and the average family size was 3.37.

In the CDP, the population was spread out, with 28.7% under the age of 18, 6.9% from 18 to 24, 29.9% from 25 to 44, 29.9% from 45 to 64, and 4.6% who were 65 years of age or older. The median age was 38 years. For every 100 females, there were 91.3 males. For every 100 females age 18 and over, there were 86.9 males.

The median income for a household in the CDP was $97,270, and the median income for a family was $103,438. Males had a median income of $65,638 versus $55,324 for females, making it one of the highest-income majority black jurisdictions in the country. 

The per capita income for the CDP was $37,734. About 2.0% of families and 3.5% of the population were below the poverty line, including 2.6% of those under age 18 and 6.0% of those age 65 or over. By the end of 2020, the CDP ranks # 7 among top 10 richest black communities in US, with an average family income of $103,438. Approximately 34% of households had incomes over $200,000. 

As of the 2018 Census, there were 4, 205 people. The population is 83.2% African American or Black. 10.2% of the population identified as White. 1.7% Identified as Hispanic. 

Like most of Prince George's County, there is a significant population of residents with ancestry in Sub-Saharan Africa. 14.4% of the population (607) shares this ancestry with 21% of residents claiming Nigeria as their country of birth. 16.8% of residents claim Sierra Leone as their country of birth. 3.9% of residents claim Ghana as their country of birth.

There is also a significant portion of residents from the West Indies. 16.9% of residents claim Jamaica as their country of birth. 12.7% of residents claim Guyana as their country of birth. 5% of residents claim Trinidad and Tobago as their country of birth.

Government
Prince George's County Police Department District 2 Station in Brock Hall CDP, with a Bowie postal address, serves the community.

Education
Woodmore CDP is zoned to schools in the Prince George's County Public Schools.

The majority Woodmore is zoned to Woodmore Elementary School. Most of the CDP is zoned to Ernest Everett Just Middle School and Benjamin Tasker Middle School. Most of the CDP is zoned to Charles Herbert Flowers High School, with portions zoned to Bowie High School.

References

External links

 Woodmore Homeowners' Association

African-American upper class
Census-designated places in Prince George's County, Maryland
Census-designated places in Maryland
Washington metropolitan area
Gated communities in Maryland